Frogs for Snakes is a 1998 film written and directed by Amos Poe.

Plot
Out of work actress Eva (Hershey), pays her way by working as a waitress at a diner in Manhattan's Lower East Side owned by Quint (Hart). She makes extra cash by making collections for her ex-husband, loan shark Al (Coltrane). The film also involves Eva's new boyfriend Zip (Leguizamo), wanna-be actress Myrna (Marie), Al's girlfriend Simone (Mazar), gangster Gascone (Perlman), and Al's driver UB (Deblinger).

Eva is ready to give up both the loan collecting and acting, dreaming of a suburban house with a picket-fence lifestyle with her son Augie (Kerkoulas). Al agrees to let her go, but needs her for just one more job, locating the missing $600,000 stolen from him by Flav (Theroux). Al also plans to produce a stage production of David Mamet's American Buffalo, and he offers a role to UB if he will murder Zip.

Principal cast
 Barbara Hershey as Eva Santana 
 Robbie Coltrane as Al Santana
 Ian Hart as Quint
 John Leguizamo as "Zip"
 Debi Mazar as Simone
 Ron Perlman as Gascone
 Justin Theroux as "Flav" Santana
 Clarence Williams III as Huck Hanley
 Harry Hamlin as Klench
 Lisa Marie as Myrna L'Hatsky
 Nick Chinlund as Iggy Schmurtz
 David Deblinger as U.B.
 Zak Kerkoulas as Augie

Critical reception
The film received mostly negative reviews.

Roger Ebert of The Chicago Sun-Times gave the film zero stars:

Mark Savlov of The Austin Chronicle:

Soundtrack listing
"Subterranean Homesick Blues" by Bob Dylan
"Uneasy Street" by Lazy Boy
"Sweet Thing" by The Gaturs
"Theme From Headtrader" by Lazy Boy
"Destination Moon" by Dinah Washington
"Delivery For Mr. Rilke" by Jeffrey Howard
"Downtown" by Toledo Diamond
"The Man with The Golden Arm" by Barry Adamson
"Blood on White Shoes" by Howard Shore
"Not a Waltz" by Wolly
"Horns for Harry" by Jeffrey Howard
"Mr. Excitement" by Tipsy
"Fly Away" by Poe
"Si Mi Chiamo Mimi" from La bohème, with vocalist Luba Orgonášová and Czecho-Slovak Radio Symphony Orchestra
"Fattening Frogs for Snakes" by Patti Smith

References

External links

1998 films
American black comedy films
American crime comedy films
Artisan Entertainment films
Films set in New York City
Films shot in New York City
American independent films
1990s English-language films
1990s American films